Billboard Top Hits: 1981 is a compilation album released by Rhino Records in 1992, featuring 10 hit recordings from 1981.

The track lineup includes eight songs that reached the top of the Billboard Hot 100 chart, including the No. 1 song of 1981, "Bette Davis Eyes" by Kim Carnes. Also included is the No. 1 song of 1982, "Physical" by Olivia Newton-John; the song began a 10-week run at No. 1 in November, after Billboard magazine's 1982 chart year had started.

The remaining two songs (Queen of Hearts and Being with You) reached No. 2 on the Hot 100.

Track listing

Track information and credits were taken from the CD liner notes.

References

1992 compilation albums
Billboard Top Hits albums